Jožef Holpert (born March 13, 1961 in Bezdan) is a former Yugoslav handball player who competed in the 1988 Summer Olympics. In 1988, he was part of the Yugoslav team, which won the bronze medal. He played all six matches and scored 15 goals.

References

External links
profile

1961 births
Living people
Yugoslav male handball players
Serbian male handball players
Handball players at the 1988 Summer Olympics
Olympic handball players of Yugoslavia
Olympic bronze medalists for Yugoslavia
Olympic medalists in handball
People from Bezdan
Medalists at the 1988 Summer Olympics
Sportspeople from Sombor